Francis M. Ssekandi (born 29 September 1940 in Mbarara, Uganda), is a Lecturer of Law at the Columbia Law School and, since 1 July 2007, a Judge of the World Bank Administrative Tribunal. He has published on Law and Development, Human Rights, and Good Governance. Ssekandi is a former Judge, High Court/Justice of Appeal (1972–1974), and member, Uganda Supreme Court (1974–1979).

Biography
He graduated in 1965 with LL.B (Hons) from the University of London and obtained his LL.M from Columbia Law School. He became a judge of the High Court of Uganda in 1974 and later Justice of Appeal of the currently renamed Supreme Court of Uganda. Before becoming a Judge Mr. Ssekandi was Director of the Law Development Center, Uganda's premier research and professional legal training institution, and was the pioneer of the highly successful Uganda Bar Course conducted by the Center. Mr. Ssekandi joined the United Nations in 1981 and was a principal legal advisor to the United Nations development programmes and was also in charge of the commercial law cluster resolving commercial disputes with the United Nations. He negotiated several technical cooperations agreements with governments and initiated many innovative institutional legal models for the delivery of UN programmes, including the Joint United Nations Programme on HIV/AIDS (UNAIDS), the African Management Services Company (AMSCO), the Global Environment Facility (GEF) and United Nations Compensation Commission after the 1991 Iraq war. In 1996 he became Deputy to the Secretary General's Special Representative in Liberia, in charge of peacekeeping operations there. In 1997 he was appointed General Counsel of the African Development Bank where he was the anchor for the institutional reforms carried out by President Omar Kabbaj, including revision of the Bank's Charter to incorporate new voting rights for shareholders, and establishment of an Administrative Tribunal to judge staff disputes. Mr. Ssekandi retired from the African Development Bank in 2000 and has since then combined teaching at Columbia University and consulting with the United Nations, its  agencies and other international institutions. He was appointed to serve as a member of the World Bank Administrative Tribunal from 2007 to 2013. He is the author of many articles on International Law and International Economic Law. He also edited Judge Elis's Second Revised Edition "New Horizons in International Law" (1992). As a judge he pioneered the integration of customary law into the general law of Uganda and wrote a number of authoritative opinions on land tenure. He currently lectures on African Law and Development, at the Columbia University Law School.  He is a board member on a number of NGOs, including the International Institute of Rural Reconstruction (IIRR), the War and Peace Centre and the International Law Institute (Uganda). He is also the founder of the African Law Reporter: Website: http://www.jurisafrica.org, and founding member of the International Projects and Mediation Associates, LLC (IPMA): Website: http://www.ipmaglobalservices.com

References

External links
 IIRR.org biography

1940 births
Living people
Alumni of the University of London
20th-century Ugandan judges
Columbia University faculty
Columbia Law School alumni
Ugandan expatriates in the United States
Ugandan expatriates in the United Kingdom